Aileen Joy Plant (died 27 March 2007) was a leading Australian infectious diseases epidemiologist. She was professor of international health at Curtin University of Technology, Perth, Western Australia.

Born in the Victorian country town of Warragul, the fourth of eight children, her parents had a car dealership and petrol station. When she was 13, the family moved to a farm near Denmark on the south coast of Western Australia. She left school at 14 to work in a bank, and later completed high school. In her early 20s she began a medical degree at the University of Western Australia.

She worked at Charles Gairdner Hospital in Perth and then at the Royal Darwin Hospital before undertaking a diploma of tropical medicine and hygiene in London. She returned to Darwin as chief medical officer and deputy secretary of the Northern Territory Department of Health and Community Services from 1989 to 1992. Her work in the Northern Territory engendered a lifelong commitment to Aboriginal health.

She always sought a balance between policy and research, describing as a professional highlight her role as founding director of the master of applied epidemiology programme at the Australian National University. Its graduates now fill key positions in Australia and internationally.

She was also instrumental in establishing the Australian Biosecurity Cooperative Research Centre, of which she was deputy director.

In 2003 the Vietnamese government awarded Aileen the "people's medal for health" for her work leading the World Health Organization's SARS team in Vietnam.

Death
She died, aged 58, in Indonesia.

Legacy
The Australian Science Communicators honoured Professor Plant as its 2007 Unsung Hero of Australian Science for her contributions to medical epidemiology.

External links
 Australian Biosecurity CRC for Emerging Infectious Disease
 WHO EINet
 Science Network WA
 Late Night Live 29 March 2007
 In memoriam Professor Aileen Joy Plant, Curtin University
 Obituary, NSW Public Health Bulletin
 2007 Winner - Prof Aileen Plant

1940s births
2007 deaths
Australian educators
Australian women epidemiologists
People from Warragul
Scientists from Western Australia
University of Western Australia alumni